The 1990–91 Soviet Cup was cup competition of the Soviet Union. The winner of the competition CSKA Moscow qualified for the continental tournament. Teams from Baltic states and Georgia withdrew from all of the Soviet competitions.

Participating teams

Source: []
Notes

Competition schedule

First preliminary round
All games took place on April 14, 1990.

|}

Second preliminary round
Games took place on May 2, 1990. Daugava Riga and Lokomotiv Moscow received bye to this stage.

|}

Bracket

Round of 32
First games took place on May 22, 1990, while second games were initially scheduled on July 18-21. With the Soviet Union falling apart some games were played much later.

|}

Round of 16
First games took place on November 11-13, 1990, while most second games were played on November 17. Both games of Shinnik and Lokomotiv match up were played in March 1991.

Quarter-finals
Most of games took place in the beginning of March in 1991, while the match between Lokomotiv Moscow and Uralmash Sverdlovsk was postponed to April.

|}

Semi-finals
Both games took place on 10 May 1991.

|}

Final

External links
 Complete calendar

Soviet Cup seasons
Cup
Cup
Soviet Cup